Thomas T. Mackie (1895-1955) was a research/public health physician in the United States Army during World War II.  He was involved in the creation of the first tropical medicine course at the US Army Medical School in 1941.  He was one of the three principal authors for the first edition of the Manual of Tropical Medicine.

Later he continued with his interests in Tropical Medicine and became the Branch Consultant and Branch Section Chief in Tropical Medicine, Veterans Administration, Professor of Preventive Medicine at the Bowman Gray School of Medicine of Wake Forest College.

Career 

Thomas Mackie graduated from Harvard in 1918 and from Columbia University as MD in 1924. He received a Postgraduate Certificate in Hygiene and Tropical Medicine in 1931 from The London School of Hygiene and Tropical Medicine. In March 1931 he was the joint recipient of college’s Duncan Medal for the highest result in the final exams.

Mackie practiced medicine in New York City throughout the 1930s and was on the teaching staff at Columbia University.

In 1940, Mackie was a founding member of and became the Director of the American Foundation for Tropical Medicine and has also by this time he had established a base in Puerto Rico.

n 1942 he was called up into the army as a lieutenant colonel, serving at the Army Medical school in Washington, in tropical medicine, and later in the South East Asia theater. He was discharged as a colonel and was awarded the  Typhus Commission Medal. Mackie co-authored the "Manual of Tropical Medicine", with George W Hunter and C Brooke Worth. At the time it became a definitive text on the subject.

In 1946 he was appointed as Professor of Preventive Medicine at the Bowman Gray Medical School in Winston Salem, North Carolina. His second wife, Janet Welch was appointed as Assistant Professor in the same department. Welch was an English doctor who had specialised in Tropical medicine and had worked as a missionary doctor in Kenya and Nyasaland in Africa during the 1920s and 30. She and Mackie first met when both were undertaking postgraduate studies at the London School of Hygiene and Tropical Medicine in 1930.

During his time at Bowman Gray, Mackie was instrumental in persuading the School to establishan Institute of Tropical Medicine in the Dominican Republic. The Woolworth family made a major financial contribution to the establishment of this Institute.

Mackie left his post at the school in the summer of 1951. Correspondence from the time suggests that his relationship with the school management had been fairly fractious from the outset.

After leaving Bowman Gray, Mackie continued to work in the field of Tropical Medicine. His post resignation correspondence with Coy Carpenter, the Dean of the School shows that by 1952, he was running the new Institute of Tropical Medicine in the Dominican Republic and that the American Foundation for Tropical Medicine had taken over the administration of the Institute from the Bowman Gray School.

Personal 

Thomas Mackie married 3 times. In 1921, he married Carolyn Bleecker Van Courtlandt; together they had two daughters, Carolyn (born in 1923) and Dorothy (1927).

Mackie divorced from Carolyn in July 1941 and married Janet Welch in March 1942.

Mackie’s second marriage ended in divorce in December 1951 and he married his third wife, Helen Holme Warnock 15 days later.

Death 

Thomas Mackie died on October 5, 1955. He suffered a pulmonary embolism in his lung which resulted in a heart attack. In April of that year he had spent several weeks in hospital recovering from the effects of smoke inhalation while fighting a fire on his land in Bridgeport, Connecticut. According to his family, he had not fully recovered at the time of his death. Legal action against the couple who allegedly started the fire was still pending at the time of his death.

See also 
 Walter Reed Tropical Medicine Course, founding member and co-author for the Manual of Tropical Medicine

References 

United States Army officers
American textbook writers
American medical writers
American male non-fiction writers
American military writers
Wake Forest University faculty
Columbia University Vagelos College of Physicians and Surgeons alumni
Harvard University alumni
1895 births
1955 deaths
20th-century American male writers